Marius Copil was the defending champion but lost in the quarterfinals to Jürgen Melzer.

Melzer won the title after defeating Márton Fucsovics 7–6(8–6), 6–2 in the final.

Seeds

Draw

Finals

Top half

Bottom half

References
Main Draw
Qualifying Draw

Hungarian Challenger Open - Singles